Gloria May Deukmejian (née Saatjian; November 1, 1933) is a former First Lady of California from 1983 to 1991 and the widow of former California Governor George Deukmejian.

Saatjian, the daughter of Armenian immigrants, was introduced to Deukmejian by his sister. They married on February 16, 1957,  and had two daughters and one son.

References

External links
First Ladies of California

 

First Ladies and Gentlemen of California
American people of Armenian descent
Living people
1930 births
People from Long Beach, California